The Chandelle Mk IV is an American ultralight aircraft that was designed by Nile Downer and produced by Chandelle Aircraft. The aircraft was supplied as a kit for amateur construction.

Design and development
It features a strut-braced high-wing, a single-seat, open cockpit, tricycle landing gear and a single engine in pusher configuration.

The aircraft is made from bolted-together aluminum tubing, with the wings and tail surfaces covered in Dacron sailcloth. Its tapered planform, single-surface,  span wing is supported by both lift struts and jury struts. The wing features 3/4 span ailerons. The pilot is accommodated in an open seat without a windshield. The tail surfaces are mounted on tubes that travel beside and below the pusher engine and propeller. The tricycle landing gear features main gear suspension.

The Mark IV appeared just before the collapse of the US ultralight market in 1984 and so few were produced or sold.

Specifications (Mk IV)

References

External links
Photo of a Mk IV

1980s United States ultralight aircraft
Homebuilt aircraft
Single-engined pusher aircraft